The M1200 Armored Knight is an armored vehicle used by forward observers in the U.S. military for precision targeting. Most of the Knights are used for operations in Iraq. The M1200 entered service in 2008.

Design

These are wheeled armored vehicles, designed using the M1117 Guardian ASV as the base, that carry the equipment needed to quickly bring in precision guided munitions and indirect artillery fire. According to the Strategy Page website; 

The Armored Knight evolved from the desire to provide enhanced protection to the fire support teams who perform the targeting mission in high threat environments.

Development

The Knight was developed in an effort to offer an armored vehicle capable of keeping up with COLTs (Combat Observation and Lasing Teams). The previous FiST-V (Fire Support Team-Vehicle) employed by the COLTs was the M707 Knight (a stripped-down variant of the Humvee).

Specifications
Standard Crew: Three
Combat Loaded Weight: Approximately 15 tons
Maximum Speed: 63 Mph
Cruising Range: 440 Miles
Targeting System: Fire Support Sensor System(FS3)
Target Location Accuracy: 1 Meter
Armament: 1 M240B or 1 M2 Browning

Components
FS3 Mounted Sensor
Targeting Station Control Panel
Mission Processor Unit
Inertial Navigation Unit
Global Positioning System Receiver
Power Distribution Unit
Stand Alone Computer Unit

See also
 M981 FISTV
 List of U.S. military vehicles by model number

References

External links
http://www.drs.com/Products/TS/m1200.aspx
https://fas.org/man/dod-101/sys/land/wsh2007/42.pdf
http://www.textronmarineandland.com/products/land/asv_armored_knight.htm

Armored fighting vehicles of the United States
Military vehicles of the United States
Military vehicles introduced in the 2000s